The Dondo Solar Power Station is a planned  solar power plant in Mozambique. The power station is part of a 160 megawatts energy package of four renewable energy power stations under development in the country. They comprise three solar power stations in the districts of Dondo, Lichinga and Chiuta, together with a wind farm in Inhambane Province. Each power station will have maximum generation capacity of 40 MW.

Location
The power station is located in Dondo District, near the town of Dondo, the district headquarters.

Overview
The power station has a 40 megawatt capacity. Its output is to be sold directly to the Mozambican public electricity utility company Electricidade de Moçambique (EDM), for integration into the national grid. The development of this power station, the first of three solar power stations and one wind farm, is part of a program known as Proler (Portuguese: "Promoçao de Leilões de Energias Renovaveis"), (English: "Renewable Energy Auction Promotion Programme"), launched in October 2020 by the President of Mozambique. The power station will be developed by an independent power producer (IPP), and is supported by the French Development Agency (AFD) and the European Union.

Developers
In November 2020, the Mozambican Energy Regulatory Authority (ARENE), announced the 12 proposals that were selected from 135 submissions from local and foreign firms to build, finance, own and operate this power station. The winning 12 firms then progressed to the final two stages of this contest.

In April 2021, five companies and consortia were selected as the top five contenders for the award to construct the power station. The five entities then progressed to the final two stages of the contest, which include technical submissions and financing details. The five finalists are listed in the table below:

In April 2022, the Mozambican Energy Regulatory Authority (ARENE), selected Total Eren, the subsidiary of TotalEnergies, to own, design, develop, fund, build and operate and maintain Dondo Solar Power Station. The enrgy generated at this solar farm will be purchased by EDM, the state-owned electricity parastatal company. The solar plant is expected to avoid the emission of 8,333 tons of carbon dioxide annually. Its output is planned to supply approximately 100,000 Mozambican customers.

See also

List of power stations in Mozambique

References

External links
 Mozambique international tender for renewable energy projects As of 1 October 2020.

Solar power stations in Mozambique
Sofala Province
Renewable energy power stations in Mozambique